Thomas John Sharpley (18 February 1906 – 30 September 1968) was an Australian rules footballer who played with Footscray and Hawthorn in the Victorian Football League (VFL).

A full back, Sharpley started his league career in 1926 with Footscray and played with them for a season and a half before moving to Hawthorn where he played with his brother Keith. In 1930, Sharpley won Hawthorn Football Club's Best and Fairest award, later known as the Peter Crimmins Medal, and finished equal fourth in the Brownlow Medal.

References

External links

1906 births
Western Bulldogs players
Hawthorn Football Club players
Peter Crimmins Medal winners
Australian rules footballers from Victoria (Australia)
1968 deaths